Neckarelz is a suburb of Mosbach in Baden-Württemberg, Germany.

Geography
Neckarelz is in northern Baden-Württemberg, between the Odenwald and Kraichgau, at the confluence of the Neckar and Elz rivers. On the other side of the Neckar, are the towns of Hochhausen and Obrigheim. Next to Neckarelz, is the suburb of Diedesheim.

History
The town was part of the Electorate of the Palatinate from around 1362.

Religion
Until World War II, Neckarelz was almost completely Protestant. After the arrival of Catholic refugees, a new church was built.

Demographics
Neckarelz is the largest suburb of Mosbach, with approximately 6,500 inhabitants.

Coat of arms
This depicts the rhombuses of the Electorate of the Palatinate at the top and a fish below.

Education
Neckarelz has several kindergartens, a primary school (named after Clemens Brentano), and a grammar and Hauptschule, (both named after Auguste Pattberg).

Transport
Neckarelz has a train station, connecting to the Neckar Valley Railway and the line to Osterburken, and a harbour.

Buildings

External links
 Webseite der Stadtverwaltung Mosbach

Neckar-Odenwald-Kreis